The 2017 TNM Super League was the 32nd season of the Super League of Malawi, the top professional league for association football clubs in Malawi since its establishment in 1986. The season started on 6 May and concluded on 22 December 2017. Kamuzu Barracks were the defending champions of the previous season. Be Forward Wanderers won the title for the first time in eleven years, defeating Masters Security 4–1 at Balaka Stadium on 16 December 2017.

Teams 
Sixteen teams compete in this season: the top thirteen teams from the previous season and three promoted teams from the regional leagues. Chitipa United, Masters Security FC and Blantyre United entered as the three promoted teams.
Other changes
 Civil Service United, which has relegated after the previous season, takes the place of EPAC United.

Standings

References

External links
Official Website

2017
Premier League
Malawi